Kasey Redfern  (born September 26, 1991) is a former American football punter. He played college football at Wofford College. He signed with the Jacksonville Jaguars as an undrafted free agent in 2014.

Professional career

Jacksonville Jaguars
After going unselected in the 2014 NFL Draft, Redfern signed with Jacksonville Jaguars on June 19, 2014. He was waived on August 30, 2014.

He re-signed with the Jaguars on January 27, 2015 on a futures contract. The Jaguars waived him on August 29, 2015.

San Diego Chargers
On December 22, 2015, the San Diego Chargers signed Redfern to their practice squad.

He signed a futures contract on January 21, 2016.

Carolina Panthers
Redfern signed with the Carolina Panthers on August 15, 2016.

Cleveland Browns
The Panthers traded Redfern and 2018 fourth round pick (later traded to the Miami Dolphins) to the Cleveland Browns for punter Andy Lee and a 2017 seventh round pick on August 29, 2016. On September 3, 2016, he was released by the Browns.

Detroit Lions
On April 25, 2017, Redfern signed with the Detroit Lions.

On September 1, 2017, Redfern was announced as the Lions' starting punter due to an injury to incumbent punter Sam Martin that would sideline him for at least the first six weeks of the season.

On September 10, in the regular season opener, Redfern suffered a torn ACL, MCL, and a partially torn patellar tendon after he was hit by Arizona Cardinals tight end Ifeanyi Momah near the sideline after Redferrn took a bobbled snap in his own end zone and tried to run for a first down. He was placed on the injured reserve on September 12, 2017.

Dallas Cowboys
On April 5, 2019, Redfern signed with the Dallas Cowboys. He was released on August 31, 2019.

Atlanta Falcons
On October 11, 2019, Redfern was signed to the Atlanta Falcons practice squad, and promoted to the active roster the next day. He was Atlanta's third punter of the season, after injuries to Matt Bosher and Matt Wile. He was waived on October 29.

References

External links
Wofford Terriers bio
San Diego Chargers bio
Jacksonville Jaguars bio

1991 births
Living people
American football punters
Players of American football from North Carolina
People from Jamestown, North Carolina
Wofford Terriers football players
Jacksonville Jaguars players
San Diego Chargers players
Carolina Panthers players
Cleveland Browns players
Detroit Lions players
Dallas Cowboys players
Atlanta Falcons players